Avenidas Novas is a freguesia (civil parish) and district of Lisbon, the capital of Portugal. Located in central Lisbon, Avenidas Novas is to the south of Alvalade, west of Areeiro, east of Campolide, and north of Santo António. The population in 2011 was 21,625,

History

"Avenidas Novas" was the known designation of Lisbon's expansion towards north by the end of the 19th century and first half of the 20th century, when several avenues connected the historical centre of the city with several places located nearby, that became part of the city limits. The avenues crossed mainly rural areas, allowing a significant urban expansion.

Eduardo VII Park was laid out in 1903.

The freguesia was created with the 2012 Administrative Reform of Lisbon, merging the former parishes of Nossa Senhora de Fátima and São Sebastião da Pedreira.

Landmarks
Eduardo VII Park
Campo Pequeno Bullring
Calouste Gulbenkian Museum
Gulbenkian Park
Hotel Ritz
Galveias Palace
Casa-Museu Dr. Anastácio Gonçalves
Estufa Fria
Nossa Senhora de Fátima Church
Praça de Espanha
São Bento Arch

References

Parishes of Lisbon
2012 establishments in Portugal